2nd National Board of Review Awards
1930
The 2nd National board of Review Awards were announced in 1930.

Top Ten Films 
All Quiet on the Western Front
Holiday
Laughter
The Man from Blankley's
Men Without Women
Morocco
Outward Bound
Romance
Street of Chance
Tol'able David

Top Foreign Films 
High Treason
Old and New
Soil
Storm Over Asia
Two Hearts in Waltz Time

External links 
 National Board of Review of Motion Pictures :: Awards for 1930

1930
1930 film awards
1930 in American cinema